Robert Inglis (born in 1933) is an actor, writer, journalist, critic and producer who has primarily worked in Australia and England. He is the narrator of the unabridged audiobook editions of J. R. R. Tolkien's The Lord of the Rings and The Hobbit.

Life and career

Inglis was born in Australia but has lived and worked in England for many years. As of 2012, he lives in Somers Town, a district in central London.

His plays include Voyage of the Endeavour (1965), based on the journal of Captain James Cook; Canterbury Tales (1968), dramatised readings from Chaucer; Erf (1971), a one-actor play about the twenty-first century; A Rum Do (1970), a musical based on the governorship of Lachlan Macquarie; and Men Who Shaped Australia, for Better or for Worse (1968), a one-actor play dealing with significant historical figures. His more recent works include a play about Lisa Pontecorvo, the daughter of geneticist Guido Pontecorvo, it played in small theatres and community centres around England in 2010 and 2011. In 2012, he was awarded a £16,000 Arts Council grant to write Regent's Canal, a Folk Opera, a musical that celebrates the 200th anniversary of the digging of the eight-mile Regent's Canal.

He has adapted works to stage for one-man performances of A Christmas Carol (1983), and Dr Jekyll and Mr Hyde, for which Inglis was called "one of the wonders of the Fringe." He has also adapted Chaucer, Shakespeare, Tolkien and Orwell to one act performances. Inglis has appeared with the Royal Shakespeare Company and the Royal Court Theatre, playing characters such as the Ghost and Claudius in Hamlet and Mr. Bumble in Oliver!.

Inglis' TV appearances including as Ned Kelly in The Stringybark Massacre (short, 1968); as Chief sub in Play for Today (TV series, 1978/79); as Professor Doom in Wizbit (TV series, 1986); as Alan Clark in Casualty (TV series, 2002).

Inglis has narrated audiobooks by Tolkien (described below), and the first three books by Ursula K. Le Guin in the Earthsea Cycle.

Tolkien works
In the 1970s and 80s, Inglis wrote, produced and acted in one-man stage dramatisations of The Hobbit and  The Lord of the Rings. These performances have been described as "award winning".

It was through his one-man stage adaptations that he was noticed by Recorded Books and asked to narrate an unabridged edition of Lord of the Rings (1990) and soon after The Hobbit (1991). It was one of Recorded Books best-selling titles however prior to 2012 it was only available on physical media (CD-ROM or tape) at which point it was released in digital format. Laura Miller of Salon.com said

"Inglis strikes precisely the right note in his narration. It is an old-fashioned audiobook narration, one that feels more read than performed, although the voices of the many characters are all well-developed. It's ever so slightly prosy, and the sensation conveyed is exactly like listening to a favourite relative read to a beloved child the same book he (beautifully) read to you when you were a child."

Until Andy Serkis' 2020 recording, Inglis' reading of The Hobbit was the only unabridged edition of the book ever made. The J.R.R. Tolkien Encyclopedia (2006) called it a "remarkable performance in which he provides distinctive voices for the various characters and sings the songs in the story". The encyclopaedia says of The Lord of the Rings, "his voices for the characters are less dramatic and there are no sound effects".

In a 2001 AudioFile interview, Inglis says they recorded Lord of the Rings in an "intense" six-week period in 1990 at the New York studio of Recorded Books. They then recorded The Hobbit about a year later. Inglis prepared with guidance from acting colleges in dramatic societies to perfect the many character voices. Inglis says, "There is much in the original writing that suggests how a character should be brought to life. It's quite strange. At times it felt like Tolkien himself was talking to me through his prose, telling me how things should be." Inglis says he composed some of the music for the songs himself, some music was composed by Tolkien, and Claudia Howard of Recorded Books composed the rest.

References

1933 births
Tolkien artists
Australian male actors
Australian writers
Australian emigrants to England
Living people